Sir Reginald Blair, 1st Baronet (8 November 1881 – 18 September 1962) was a British politician. He served as a Conservative Member of Parliament (MP) from 1912 to 1922, and from 1935 to 1945.

Early life
Blair was born in Glasgow in 1881. He was educated at Kelvinside Academy and Glasgow University, after which he became an accountant. Blair was married, and had a son Malcolm Reginald Blair, who died on 31 May 1940, aged 33, while in active service in World War II.

Early career
Blair was first elected to Parliament in a by-election in the Bow and Bromley constituency on 26 November 1912. The by-election was caused by George Lansbury, the Labour MP, taking the Chiltern Hundreds, a way of resigning from the House of Commons. Lansbury caused the by-election to highlight the issue of women's suffrage, but the Labour Party did not endorse him as their candidate so he stood as an independent on a platform of "Votes for Women". Labour did not stand a candidate, and Blair won the by-election by a majority of 751 votes.

For the first two years of World War I, Blair served with the British Expeditionary Force and was mentioned in dispatches. From 1916 to 1918, he served as a field cashier with the temporary rank of Major. Reginald Blair held his seat in the 1918 general election, but was defeated in 1922 by Lansbury, who remained Bow and Bromley's MP until his death in 1940. Following his election defeat, Blair was knighted, and became the Chairman of the Racehorse Betting Control Board.

Later career
In the 1935 general election, Reginald Blair was elected as MP for Hendon, succeeding the Conservative Philip Cunliffe-Lister. On 19 June 1945, he was created a baronet, of Harrow Weald in the County of Middlesex. His Hendon seat was abolished for the 1945 general election, and he retired. Reginald Blair died in 1962, aged 80, and was buried in Harrow Cemetery in Harrow, London. The baronetcy became extinct on his death.

References
Specific

General

 British Parliamentary Election Results 1918–1949, compiled and edited by F.W.S. Craig (The Macmillan Press 1977)
 Who's Who of British Members of Parliament: Volume III 1919–1945, edited by M. Stenton and S. Lees (The Harvester Press 1976)

External links 
 

1881 births
1962 deaths
British Army officers
Military personnel from Glasgow
Baronets in the Baronetage of the United Kingdom
Conservative Party (UK) MPs for English constituencies
UK MPs 1910–1918
UK MPs 1918–1922
UK MPs 1935–1945
Alumni of the University of Glasgow
People educated at Kelvinside Academy
British Army personnel of World War I
Knights Bachelor
Politicians awarded knighthoods